Ashot Hovakimian (born 16 November 1961, Yerevan, Armenia)  is an Armenian diplomat and since 2011 the Deputy Minister of Foreign Affairs.

Hovakimian was the Ambassador of Armenia to Poland from 1999 to 2006 and was also accredited as non-resident ambassador to the three Baltic states from 2000 to 2006. In 2008 he became Ambassador to Austria with concurrent accreditation to Hungary, Slovakia and the Czech Republic. He held those posts until his appointment as Deputy Minister in 2011.

References

Diplomats from Yerevan
Ambassadors of Armenia to Poland
Ambassadors of Armenia to Latvia
Ambassadors of Armenia to Lithuania
Ambassadors of Armenia to Estonia
Ambassadors of Armenia to Austria
Ambassadors of Armenia to Hungary
Ambassadors of Armenia to the Czech Republic
Ambassadors of Armenia to Slovakia
1961 births
Living people
Recipients of the Order of the Cross of Terra Mariana, 2nd Class